The Antares Paradox is a 2022 Spanish science-fiction drama film directed, written, and lensed by Luis Tinoco in his feature film directorial debut. It stars .

Plot 
The fiction takes place in a single room, involving dedicated astrophysicist Alexandra Baeza, who interacts via phone and video with the rest of characters. Alexandra is working in a Spanish branch of the SETI project. Upon receiving a signal from the Antares system that could herald the confirmation of extraterrestrial intelligence (and which she is required to verify), she receives the news of her father being at death's door. She faces a dilemma as to whether priority should be given to career or to family.

Cast

Production 
Produced by VFX outfit Onirikal Studio, The Antares Paradox is the debut feature film of Luis Tinoco, a visual effects artist. Tinoco also wrote the screenplay;  Bataller composed the score and Frank Gutierrez worked in film editing. Filming lasted for three weeks, and took place in a set prepared inside the production company's premises.

Release 
The film made its world premiere at the Austin-based Fantastic Fest in September 2022. It also made it to the 55th Sitges Film Festival's 'New Visions' lineup (for its European premiere).

Reception 
Germain Lussier of Gizmodo found the film, described as "Contact meets 24 in a single room", to be his favorite picture of Fantastic Fest 2022, being "that well made, that effective, and that universal", "destined to be remade on a bigger scale".

Mae Abdulbaki of ScreenRant rated the film 4 out of 5 stars ("excellent") assessing that it "is intense, well-made, explores interesting themes, and is bolstered by a fabulous central performance from Andrea Trepat".

See also 
 List of Spanish films of 2022
 List of one-location films

References 

2020s science fiction drama films
2020s Spanish-language films
2020s Spanish films
Spanish science fiction drama films
Spanish thriller drama films
2022 thriller drama films
Films set in Spain
Search for extraterrestrial intelligence in film and television
Films about extraterrestrial life
2022 directorial debut films